Monkey Point (or Pim's Bay) is a village in South Caribbean Coast Autonomous Region, Nicaragua, south of Bluefields.

It is located near the site of a planned US$350 million seaport, to be financed by Iran and Venezuela. More recently American and South Korean investors have expressed interest in developing a container terminal there. This container terminal will be situated at the Caribbean end of the planned Ecocanal, which will link Monkey Point to the town of Corinto on the Pacific coast of Nicaragua.

References

External links
 Images of Monkey Point

Populated places in Nicaragua
South Caribbean Coast Autonomous Region
Road-inaccessible communities of North America